Federico Chávez Careaga (February 15, 1882 – April 24, 1978) was a Paraguayan politician and soldier who served as President of Paraguay from September 10, 1949, to May 4, 1954. He was a member of the Colorado Party.

Early life 
Chávez was born on February 15, 1882, in Paraguarí. His parents were the Portuguese Federico Chávez and his wife Felicia Careaga, from Guaira, Paraguay.

Political history 
Chávez, who received his law degree in 1905, was a longtime leader of the right-of-centre National Republican Association, better known as the Colorado Party. When his party served in a coalition government in 1946, Chávez was appointed to the Supreme Court. He served as Paraguay's foreign minister from 1947. He was elected in April 1949 as President of the Chamber of Representatives, and kept that post until he became president in September 1949. He was elected for a three-year term in 1950 and later reelected in 1953. When Chávez tried to strengthen his regime by arming the national police in 1954, a coup d'état led by General Alfredo Stroessner on May 4 ended his administration.

Death 
Chávez died on 24 April 1978 at the age of 96 in the city of Asunción, from natural causes. He was buried with full state honours; Stroessner attended the services. When Isidro Ayora died on 22 March 1978 until his own death, he became the oldest living state leader.

References

Sources 
 Crónica Histórica Ilustrada del Paraguay, Distribuidora Quevedo de Ediciones, Buenos Aires,  (Page 856)

1882 births
1978 deaths
Paraguayan people of Portuguese descent
People from Paraguarí
Colorado Party (Paraguay) politicians
Presidents of Paraguay
Paraguayan soldiers
Leaders ousted by a coup
Presidents of the Chamber of Deputies of Paraguay
Government ministers of Paraguay
Paraguayan judges
Foreign Ministers of Paraguay